Horstead with Stanninghall is a civil parish in the English county of Norfolk which is also known as 'The Gateway of The Broads' consisting of the former parishes of Horstead and Stanninghall.
For the purposes of local government, it falls within the district of Broadland.  As well as Stanninghall, Horstead also includes the hamlets of Largate and Heggatt.

There is a history of the parish, written by Percy Millican, bearing the descriptive title 'The History of Horstead and Stanninghall'.

Horstead 
Horstead is today a dormitory village of Norwich. It contains a public house, a butchers, a florists, two garages and a garden equipment store.

Stanninghall 
Stanninghall contains an old farmhouse, on the site of a medieval manor house which acquired the title of 'Stanninghall Hall', the remains of a church tower and a number of council houses. In the inter-war years, it was an isolation settlement for people suffering from tuberculosis. Millican states that the church was allowed to fall down by the family at the Hall who were Roman Catholics.

Horstead Mill 

Horstead is well known for its mill which is used for recreational activities like kayaking, fishing and swimming. The mill was gutted by fire in 1963 which burnt most of the mill and for health and safety reasons more of the mill had to be destroyed after the fire. The mill was bought with a lottery fund of £105,000 in 1997 after the parish council requested a grant. The mill is now open to the public and there is a small walk around the mill and the site is also the start of a walk along the river which ends up at Brampton.

Wildlife in Horstead with Stanninghall 
Horstead has a variety of wildlife, as it is near the Broads and has many types of habitat and many undisturbed areas. Much wildlife can be found, including Red Deer, Roe Deer, Muntjac Deer, Tawny Owl, Barn Owl, and other birds and mammals.

See also
Horstead Hall

Notes

External links

Civil parishes in Norfolk
Broadland